The Mae West Lips Sofa is a surrealist sculpture in the form of a sofa by Salvador Dalí. The light red,  sized seating furniture made of polyurethane foam coated with a red polidur coating was shaped in 1972 after the lips of actress Mae West, whom Dalí apparently found fascinating. Dalí never intended for the sofa to serve a functional use. He also claimed that he partly based the design of the sofa on a pile of rocks near Cadaqués and Portlligat, where he stayed for many years with his wife, Gala Éluard Dalí. The sofa was produced in 1973 by Bocaccio Design, known also as BD Barcelona Design.

Edward James, a rich British patron of the Surrealists in the 1930s, originally commissioned the piece from Dalí. It is now part of the art collections at the Museum Boijmans Van Beuningen in Rotterdam, and was on loan to Te Papa Tongarewa in Wellington until November 2021. Another version is on display at the Dalí Theatre and Museum in Figueres, Catalonia, Spain. A version is owned by the Victoria and Albert Museum, having exhibited another example at the 2007 exhibition Surreal Things: Surrealism and Design, while another version  is on display at Brighton Museum.

See also
Lobster Telephone
Rainy Taxi

References

External links
 The Mae West Lips Sofa by Salvador Dalí and Oscar Tusquets Blanca at the design agency Tagwerc

1937 works
Decorative arts
Furnishings
Works by Salvador Dalí
Surrealist works
Cultural depictions of Mae West
Lips
Collection of the Dalí Theatre and Museum